The Neotropical tortoise beetle tribe Spilophorini comprises two genera, Calyptocephala Chevrolat, 1836 (12 species) and Spilophora Boheman, 1850 (18 species). Biological information is limited.

References

Cassidinae
Polyphaga tribes